Usman Limbada (born 1 October 1989) is a cricketer who plays for Canada. He bats right-handed and bowls right-arm medium.

Career
Usman played his maiden first-class match against a Zimbabwe XI on 2 August 2010, scoring five runs. He made his One Day International debut against Afghanistan on 16 February 2010 and his Twenty20 International debut in the same month against Ireland.

References

External links

1989 births
Living people
Canadian cricketers
Cricketers at the 2011 Cricket World Cup
Cricketers from Ontario
Canada One Day International cricketers
Canada Twenty20 International cricketers
Sportspeople from Scarborough, Toronto